Giovanni Coletti may refer to:

 Giovanni Battista Coletti (born 1948), Italian fencer
 Giovanni Giacomo Coleti (1734–1827), or Coletti, Italian historian and philologist